Sierra Stranger is a 1957 American Western film directed by Lee Sholem and starring Howard Duff.

The film's sets were designed by the art director Ernst Fegté.

Plot
A prospector becomes a small town outcast after he rescues a man about to be lynched.

Cast
 Howard Duff as Jess Collins 
 Gloria McGehee as Meg Anderson 
 Dick Foran as Bert Gaines 
 John Hoyt as Sheriff 
 Barton MacLane as Lem Gotch 
 George E. Stone as Barfly Dan 
 Ed Kemmer as Sonny Grover 
 Robert Foulk as Tom Simmons 
 Eve McVeagh as Ruth Gaines 
 Henry Kulky as Bartender Matt (as Henry 'Bomber' Kulky)
 Byron Foulger as Claim Clerk Kelso

References

Bibliography
 Pitts, Michael R. Western Movies: A Guide to 5,105 Feature Films. McFarland, 2012.

External links
 

1957 films
1957 Western (genre) films
American Western (genre) films
Films directed by Lee Sholem
Columbia Pictures films
American black-and-white films
1950s English-language films
1950s American films